Holetín is a municipality in Chrudim District in the Pardubice Region of the Czech Republic. It has about 800 inhabitants.

Administrative parts
Holetín is made up of villages of Dolní Holetín, Horní Babákov and Horní Holetín.

History
The first written mention of Holetín is from 1144. It was situated on a trade route from Bohemia to Moravia.

References

External links

Villages in Chrudim District